Dread and Terror Ridge [elevation: ] is a ridge in Douglas County, Oregon, in the United States.

The ridge was named from the great number of thorny plants there.

References

Landforms of Douglas County, Oregon
Ridges of Oregon